René Alfred Robert de Doynel de Quincey (26 May 1858 – 23 August 1924) was a French equestrian. He competed in the hacks and hunter combined event at the 1900 Summer Olympics.

References

External links

1858 births
1924 deaths
French male equestrians
Olympic equestrians of France
Equestrians at the 1900 Summer Olympics
Sportspeople from Calvados (department)